Natalya Nikolaevna Melyokhina (born 5 April 1962) is a Soviet Union female road cyclist. She became World Champion in the women's team time trial at the UCI Road World Championships in 1987 and finished second in 1990. In 1990 she also won stage 5 in Tour Cycliste Féminin de la Drôme and finished second in the general classiciation.

References

External links
 

1962 births
Living people
Soviet female cyclists
UCI Road World Champions (women)